Samsung W880 (also known as Samsung AMOLED 12 in South Korea) was a high-spec mobile phone model from Samsung announced in September 2009. It was the world's first 12 mega pixel camera with 3x optical zoom and 720p HD video.

Full specifications
Camera
 Megapixels: 12
 Maximum photo resolution: 4000x3000 pixels
 Optical zoom: 3x
 Digital zoom: yes
 Auto focus: Yes
 Flash: Yes
 Recording video: 720p HD recording at 30fps
 Second (front) camera  Yes

References

W880
Mobile phones introduced in 2010